Homalopteroides yuwonoi is a species of ray-finned fish in the genus Homalopteroides.

References

Balitoridae
Freshwater fish of Indonesia
Fish described in 1998